David Jagger (born 9 June 1949) is an English professional golfer.

Jagger was born in Sheffield. He played on the European Tour for many years, where he was renowned as a joker, but had most of his success playing on the Safari Circuit in Africa during the European winters in the 1970s and 1980s. He won several tournaments on that circuit, including the Nigerian Open three times, and topped the money list in 1982. He also recorded a round of 59 during the pro-am prior to the 1973 Nigerian Open. His best placing on the European Order of Merit was 26th in 1976.

Jagger played in several Open Championships, making the final round on four occasions with a best finish of tied for 28th place behind Gary Player at Royal Lytham in 1974. In addition to playing tournament golf, he also worked as a club professional at Selby Golf Club between 1978 and 1988. Since 1988 he has been at Hull Golf Club.

Professional wins (12)

Safari Circuit wins (5)
1974 Kenya Open
1975 Nigerian Open
1977 Nigerian Open
1982 Nigerian Open, Kalahari Diamond Classic (Botswana)

Other wins (7)
4 Yorkshire Open wins
2 Northern PGA Championship wins
1980 Slazenger PGA Club Professionals' Championship

Results in major championships

Note: Jagger only played in The Open Championship.

CUT = missed the half-way cut (3rd round cut in 1972 and 1981 Open Championships)
"T" indicates a tie for a place

Team appearances
Professional
Hennessy Cognac Cup  (representing Great Britain and Ireland): 1976 (winners)
PGA Cup: 1980

References

External links

English male golfers
European Tour golfers
Sportspeople from Sheffield
1949 births
Living people